Capital Health was a public health authority providing complete health services to Edmonton, Alberta's capital city, and its surrounding central Alberta communities.  It was also the largest single employer in the province of Alberta, employing approximately 30,000 people.  In 2008 it was merged into Alberta Health Services.

History

The Capital Health Authority was created on June 24, 1994 under Alberta's Regional Health Authorities Act.  On May 26, 2003 it was renamed Capital Health. On July 1, 2008 it was absorbed into the province-wide Alberta Health Services Board.

Location
Capital Health was entered in the province of Alberta, it is bordered to the north and west by the Aspen Regional Health Authority, to the east by East Central Health and to the south by the David Thompson Regional Health Authority.

Capital Health provided health services to more than one million residents within its geographic boundaries.  It also provided specialized programs and services to people throughout Alberta, Western Canada and Canada's northern territories.

The communities within Capital Health's service area include:

Health facilities
Capital Health provides health care services in the following hospitals and health centres:

The Misercordia and Grey Nuns hospitals were jointly operated by Capital Health and the Caritas Health Group.  Caritas Health Group is a Catholic provider of health care in Alberta.  It also operates the Edmonton General Continuing Care Centre.

References

External links
 Capital Health Region Website
 Caritas Health Group Website
 Alberta Health & Wellness Website

1994 establishments in Alberta
2008 disestablishments in Alberta
Health regions of Alberta
Organizations established in 1994